They Said It Couldn't Be Done is an album by Grandmaster Flash, released in 1985. It is his second overall studio album, and his first album credited solely to him following the breakup of the Furious Five due to the departure of rappers Melle Mel, Scorpio, and Keith Cowboy. For They Said It Couldn't Be Done, Flash signed with Elektra Records and retained the services of Rahiem and The Kidd Creole. New rappers Lavon (Kevin LaVon Dukes), Mr Broadway (Russell Wheeler), and dancer Larry Love (Larry Parker) were added. The album was re-issued on CD in the US for the first time on April 26, 2005 (DBK Works dbk514).

It was the first album the group released on a major label. It was produced by Gavin Christopher and Grandmaster Flash (the group). The album also included "Girls Love the Way He Spins", "Sign of the Times", "Paradise" and "Rock the House (Alternate Groove)". It was the first hip hop album released by Elektra Records.

Track listing
"Girls Love the Way He Spins" – 6:34
"The Joint Is Jumpin'" – 3:44
"Rock the House" – 5:45
"Jailbait" – 4:52
"Sign of the Times" – 6:09
"Larry's Dance Theme" – 3:21
"Who's That Lady" – 5:26
"Alternate Groove" – 5:26
"Paradise" – 5:24

Personnel
Grandmaster Flash – Arranger, spinner and background vocals
The Kidd Creole – writer, arranger and background vocals
Rahiem – Lead and background vocals, rapper, arranger and writer
La Von Dukes – (Kevin L. Dukes) writer, rapper, arranger, Bass Guitar and background vocals
Mr. Broadway – Rapper, background vocals
Larry Love – Dancer, specializing in Electric Boogie, background vocals

Musicians
Gavin Christopher – drum machine programming, Simmons toms and percussion, OB8 synthesizer bass
Grandmaster Flash, Dave Ogrin, Paul Pesco – additional drum programming
Gavin Christopher, Vince Madison, Dave Ogrin, Terry Marshall, Rahiem, Grandmaster Flash – keyboards
Vince Madison, Gavin Christopher – Oberheim system programming
Paul Pesco, Richard Davis – guitars
Michael A. Levine - sampling keyboards

References

1985 albums
Grandmaster Flash albums
Elektra Records albums
Albums produced by Grandmaster Flash